Weston-on-Avon is a village in Warwickshire, England. The population of the Civil Parish taken at the 2011 census was 170.

History
Originally in Gloucestershire, Weston-on-Avon was transferred to Warwickshire in 1931. The Domesday book recorded that Weston was one of about six villages in the area given to Hugh de Grandmesnil as reward for his help at the Battle of Hastings.

Notable people
 Robert Fisher Tomes, English farmer and zoologist, was born here on 4 August 1823.
 Sir John Greville, an MP in seven Parliaments, was buried here in 1444; there is also a stained glass window fragment showing him and his wife in St Peter's Church
 Sir John Tomes, English dentist and campaigned for the registration of dentists, was born here on 21 March 1815.
 John Trapp, vicar of Weston and Anglican Bible commentator, died here in 1669.

See also
All Saints Church, Weston-on-Avon

References

External links

Villages in Warwickshire